Luigi Pieroni (born 8 September 1980) is a former Belgian professional football, who played as a forward, and current assistant manager of Raja CA.

Playing career
Pieroni was born in Liège, Belgium. He finished the 2003–04 Belgian First Division season as topscorer with 28 goals while he was playing for R.E. Mouscron. He previously played with R.F.C. Liégeois, Auxerre and was loaned out to Lens and Anderlecht while he was under contract with the FC Nantes. In 2008, he signed with Valenciennes and in 2010 he returned to Belgium, where he signed with K.A.A. Gent. After a two-year stint with Standard Liège, he signed a contract with French Ligue 2 club AC Arles-Avignon on 19 July 2011. His playing career came to a halt in the end of the 2012–13 season when he retired at the age of 32 due to a long time Phlebitis.

Coaching career
In March 2016 it was announced, that Pieroni had returned to Standard Liège and should be working as a forward coach for the club's academy, scout for the first team and also as assistant manager for the reserve team.

Pieroni left Standard in the summer 2019, to become the assistant manager of his former teammate, Christophe Grégoire, at Royal Football Club Seraing.

After promotion to the Jupiler Pro League in 2021, Luigi Pieroni left Seraing to train the U16 youth of KAA Gent, following head coach Emilio Ferrera who became head of youth at Gent.

On 16 november 2021 it got known that Pieroni quitted the U16 of KAA Gent to become the assistant of Marc Wilmots at Raja CA.

Personal life
He has a son, Gianluca born on 4 January 2007.

International goals
Scores and results list Belgium's goal tally first, score column indicates score after each Pieroni goal.

References

External links
 
 

1980 births
Living people
Footballers from Liège
Association football forwards
Belgian footballers
Belgium international footballers
Belgian people of Italian descent
RFC Liège players
Royal Excel Mouscron players
AJ Auxerre players
FC Nantes players
RC Lens players
Valenciennes FC players
AC Arlésien players
R.S.C. Anderlecht players
Standard Liège players
K.A.A. Gent players
Belgian Pro League players
Ligue 1 players
Ligue 2 players
Belgian expatriate footballers
Belgian expatriate sportspeople in France
Expatriate footballers in France